Events from the year 1797 in Russia

Incumbents
 Monarch – Paul I

Events
 Third Partition of Poland
 Pauline Laws - house laws of the House of Romanov established
 April 5 – Manifesto of three-day corvee
 Office of the Institutions of Empress Maria
 Herzen University founded
 Saint Petersburg Theological Academy founded

Births
 Alexander Bestuzhev, Decembrist, writer (d. 1837)
 Dimitri Ivanovich Dolgorukov, diplomat and travelling companion of Washington Irving (d. 1867)
 Yelizaveta Golitsyna, noblewoman, Roman Catholic nun (d. 1844)
 Innocent of Alaska, Russian Orthodox missionary priest, Orthodox bishop and archbishop in the Americas, and Metropolitan of Moscow and all Russia. (d. 1879)
 Alexander Kazarsky, naval officer, war hero (d. 1833)
 Nikolay Dmitrievich Mylnikov, portrait painter (d. 1842)
 Arsena Odzelashvili, Georgian outlaw, (d. 1842)
 Friedrich Benjamin von Lütke, Russian navigator, geographer, and Arctic explorer. (d. 1882)

Deaths
 Ivan Chernyshyov, diplomat and admiralty official (b. 1726)
 Ekaterina Kniazhnina, poet (b. 1746)
 Pyotr Melissino, General of the Artillery (b. 1726)
 Vasily Pashkevich, composer, singer, violinist, teacher (b. circa 1742)
 Alexei Senyavin, admiral (b. 1716)
 Ivan Shuvalov, first Russian Minister of Education (b. 1727)

References

1797 in Russia
Years of the 18th century in the Russian Empire